The 2009–10 FIBA Americas League was the third edition of the first-tier and most important professional international club basketball competition in the regions of South America, Central America, the Caribbean, and Mexico, with the winner of the competition being crowned as the best team and champion of all of those regions. It was played between December 6, 2009 and February 6, 2010.  The tournament was won by the Argentine League club Peñarol Mar del Plata, which was their second title in three years.

Group stage

Group A

Group B

Group C

Group D

Final 4

Round 1

Round 2

Round 3

External links
FIBA Americas League 
FIBA Americas League 
FIBA Americas  
FIBA Liga Americas Twitter 
LatinBasket.com FIBA Americas League 
Liga de las Américas YouTube Channel 

2009–10
2009–10 in South American basketball
2009–10 in North American basketball